British Airways Football Club is a football club based in Bedfont, Greater London, England.

History
The first mention of the club is from April 1947, when it was the works team of British Overseas Airways Corporation (BOAC). In 1982 the BOAC team merged with the works team of British European Airways (the BOAC and BEA companies had merged in 1974) to form British Airways Football Club. At the time of the merger, the club had over 200 members, fielding 15 adult teams. The Saturday team played in the West Middlesex League and then the London Commercial League. The club were one of the most successful in the league, winning the Division One title and League Cup several times, the Middlesex Premier Cup in 1996–97 and the Middlesex County Intermediate Cup a record nine times.

After winning the Intermediate Cup three seasons in a row between 2004–05 and 2006–07, the club entered a team into the Middlesex County League, joining Division Three (Hounslow & District), which they finished bottom of in 2007–08. In 2011 league reorganisation saw them moved up to Division Two. In 2012–13 the club's first team transferred from the London Commercial League to the Middlesex County League Premier Division, with the team in Division Two becoming British Airways Thirds. The first team won the Premier Division at the first attempt. After winning the league title again in 2017–18, they were promoted to Division One of the Combined Counties League.

Ground
The club originally played at the Concorde Centre in Cranford. When they joined the Combined Counties League, they began groundsharing with Bedfont & Feltham at the Orchard.

Honours
Middlesex County League
Premier Division champions 2012–13, 2017–18
Middlesex Premier Cup
Winners 1996–97
Middlesex Intermediate Cup
Winners 2004–05, 2005–06, 2006–07

Records
Best FA Vase performance: First qualifying round, 2018–19, 2019–20

References

External links
Official website

Association football clubs established in 1947
1947 establishments in England
Football clubs in England
Football clubs in London
Combined Counties Football League
Middlesex County Football League
British Airways
Sport in the London Borough of Hounslow
Works association football teams in England